The 2016 Summer Olympics, officially known as the Games of the XXXI Olympiad, were held in Rio de Janeiro, Brazil, from 5 August 2016 to 21 August 2016.

Approximately 11,000 athletes from 206 nations participated in 306 events in 42 Olympic sport disciplines.

{| id="toc" class="toc" summary="Contents"
|-
| style="text-align:center;" colspan=3|Contents
|- style="vertical-align:top;"
|
Archery
Athletics
Badminton
Basketball
Boxing
Canoeing
Cycling
Diving
Equestrian
Fencing
|valign=top|
Field hockey
Football
Golf
Gymnastics
Handball
Judo
Modern pentathlon
Rowing
Rugby sevens
Sailing
|valign=top|
Shooting
Swimming
Synchronized swimming
Table tennis
Taekwondo
Tennis
Triathlon
Volleyball
Water polo
Weightlifting
Wrestling
|-
| colspan=3|

|}


Archery

Athletics

(WR = World Record, OR = Olympic Record)

Men

* Indicates the athlete only competed in the preliminary heats and received medals.

Women

* Indicates the athlete only competed in the preliminary heats and received medals.

Badminton

Basketball

Boxing

Men

 Misha Aloian of  originally won the silver medal, but was disqualified after he tested positive for Tuaminoheptane.

Women

Canoeing

Slalom

Sprint

Men's

Women's

Cycling

Road cycling

Track cycling

Men's

Women's

Mountain biking

BMX

Diving

Men

Women

Equestrian

Fencing

Men's

Women's

Field hockey

Football

Golf

Gymnastics

Artistic

Men's events

Women's events

Rhythmic

Trampoline

Handball

Judo

Men's events

Women's events

Modern pentathlon

Rowing

Men's events

Women's events

Rugby sevens

Sailing

Women's events

Men's events

Mixed events

Shooting

Men's events

Women's events

Swimming

Men's events

 Swimmers who participated in the heats only and received medals.

Women's events

 Swimmers who participated in the heats only and received medals.

Synchronized swimming

Table tennis

Taekwondo

Men's events

Women's events

Tennis

Triathlon

Volleyball

Indoor volleyball

Beach volleyball

Water polo

Weightlifting

Men's events

Women's events

Wrestling

Men's Greco-Roman

Men's freestyle

Women's freestyle

Changes in medals

On 18 August 2016, Kyrgyz weightlifter Izzat Artykov was stripped of his bronze medal in the men's 69 kg event after testing positive for strychnine. Luis Javier Mosquera of Colombia, who had been the fourth-place finisher before Artykov's disqualification, was moved into third place.

On 8 December 2016, the CAS disqualified weightlifter Gabriel Sîncrăian of Romania and boxer Misha Aloian of Russia after he tested positive for tuaminoheptane.

See also 
 2016 Summer Olympics medal table

References

External links

Official website
Medal winners

medal winners
Lists of Summer Olympic medalists by year
 
Rio de Janeiro (city)-related lists